Dordogne is a French département.

Dordogne may also refer to:

 Dordogne (river), a river in France
 , a tanker ship built in 1914 and scuttled in 1940